Temple Adas Israel is Reform synagogue in Sag Harbor, New York.   It is one of fewer than 100 19th century synagogue buildings still standing in the United States.

History

Describing itself as "Long Island’s oldest synagogue", Temple Adas Israel was founded as Congregation Mishkan Israel in 1893, the temple purchased land 1896 and the building was completed in 1898. The Brooklyn Daily Eagle attributed the creation of the new congregation to the establishment of Fahy's watchcase factory, which had drawn a large number of Russian and Polish-Jewish workingmen to Sag Harbor. Within a short time, there were 15 Jewish-owned retail stores in the village and the Brooklyn Eagle reported that Jewish success in retailing fruit and clothing "testify to their industry."

The simple, vernacular building is a rectangle, 24' by 30', with a pitched roof.  The entrance door is dignified by a flight of stairs and flanked by Gothic, pointed-arch windows, the other windows are round-arched.

References

External links
 Temple Adas Israel website

Reform synagogues in New York (state)
Synagogues in Suffolk County, New York
Synagogues completed in 1898
1898 establishments in New York (state)
Polish-Jewish culture in New York (state)
Russian-Jewish culture in New York (state)